Lincolndale is a hamlet and census-designated place (CDP) located in the town of Somers in Westchester County, New York, United States. The population was 1,521 at the 2010 census.

Geography
Lincolndale is located at  (41.338983, -73.725756).

Demographics

At the 2000 census there were 2,018 people, 717 households, and 590 families residing in the hamlet. The population density was 1,441.2 per square mile (556.5/km). There were 742 housing units at an average density of 529.9/sq mi (204.6/km).  The racial makeup of the hamlet was 96.68% White, 0.74% African American, 0.05% Native American, 1.39% Asian, 0.15% from other races, and 0.99% from two or more races. Hispanic or Latino of any race were 2.58%.

Of the 717 households, 43.8% had children under the age of 18 living with them, 70.0% were married couples living together, 8.9% had a female householder with no husband present, and 17.6% were non-families. 14.6% of households were one person, and 5.4% were one person aged 65 or older. The average household size was 2.81 and the average family size was 3.12.

In the hamlet the population was spread out, with 27.8% under the age of 18, 4.7% from 18 to 24, 33.0% from 25 to 44, 24.9% from 45 to 64, and 9.6% 65 or older. The median age was 38 years. For every 100 females, there were 95.9 males. For every 100 females age 18 and over, there were 91.8 males.

The median household income was $89,087 and the median family income was $96,290. Males had a median income of $66,875 versus $50,938 for females. The per capita income for the hamlet was $36,024. About 1.4% of families and 0.8% of the population were below the poverty line, including none of those under the age of 18, or over 65.

References

Hamlets in New York (state)
Census-designated places in New York (state)
Census-designated places in Westchester County, New York
Hamlets in Westchester County, New York
Somers, New York